Sandipta Sen is a Bengali television actress. In 2009 and 2010, she was awarded the Tele Shamman Award for her debut serial Durga. Then in 2014, 2015, and 2017, she was awarded the Tele Academy Award for Best Actress.

Early life and education
She completed her graduation in Psychology honours from Asutosh College, Kolkata and later she completed her master's degree in Applied psychology from Rajabazar Science College (Calcutta university).

Works

Tv Shows

Films

Web series

Reality shows

References

External links
 

Indian film actresses
Living people
Place of birth missing (living people)
1987 births
Bengali television actresses